Darwin Piñeyrúa (23 December 1945 – 11 February 1978) was a Uruguayan athlete. He competed in the men's hammer throw at the 1972 Summer Olympics.

References

External links
 

1945 births
1978 deaths
Athletes (track and field) at the 1972 Summer Olympics
Uruguayan male hammer throwers
Olympic athletes of Uruguay
Sportspeople from Montevideo
Pan American Games medalists in athletics (track and field)
Pan American Games bronze medalists for Uruguay
Athletes (track and field) at the 1971 Pan American Games
Athletes (track and field) at the 1975 Pan American Games
Medalists at the 1971 Pan American Games
20th-century Uruguayan people